Sterling Allen Brown (May 1, 1901 – January 13, 1989) was an American professor, folklorist, poet, and literary critic. He chiefly studied black culture of the Southern United States and was a professor at Howard University for most of his career. Brown was the first Poet Laureate of the District of Columbia.

Early life and education
Brown was born May 1, 1901 on the campus of Howard University in Washington, D.C., where his father, Sterling N. Brown, a former slave, was a prominent minister and professor at Howard University Divinity School. His mother Grace Adelaide Brown, who had been the valedictorian of her class at Fisk University, taught in D.C. public schools for more than 50 years. Both his parents grew up in Tennessee and often shared stories with Brown and his sister Mary Edna Brown (a founder of Delta Sigma Theta sorority) about famous leaders such as Frederick Douglass and Booker T. Washington.

Brown's early childhood was spent on a farm on Whiskey Bottom Road in Howard County, Maryland. He was educated at Waterford Oaks Elementary and Dunbar High School, where he graduated as the top student. He received a scholarship to attend Williams College in Massachusetts. Graduating from Williams Phi Beta Kappa in 1922, he continued his studies at Harvard University, receiving an MA in English a year later. That same year of 1923, he was hired as an English lecturer at Virginia Theological Seminary and College in Lynchburg, Virginia, a position he held for the next three years. He never pursued a doctorate degree, but several colleges gave him honorary doctorates. Brown won the Graves Prize for his essay "The Comic Spirit in Shakespeare and Moliere" during his senior year at Williams.

Marriage and family
Brown married Daisy Turnbull in 1927 and they adopted a son, Johnathon L. Dennis. Daisy was an occasional muse for Brown; his poems "Long Track Blues" and "Against That Day" were inspired by her.

Academic career
Brown began his teaching career with positions at several universities, including Lincoln University and Fisk University, before returning to Howard in 1929. He was a professor there for 40 years. Brown's poetry used the South for its setting and chronicled the experiences of enslaved African-American people. In his creative work, Brown often imitated southern African-American speech, using "variant spellings and apostrophes to mark dropped consonants". He taught and wrote about African-American literature and folklore. He was a pioneer in the appreciation of this genre. He had an "active, imaginative mind" when writing and "a natural gift for dialogue, description and narration".

Brown was known for introducing his students to concepts in jazz, which, along with blues, spirituals and other forms of black music, formed an integral component of his poetry. He was a speaker at the famous From Spirituals to Swing concerts, and his introduction can be heard on the recordings made of the performances.

In addition to his career at Howard University, Brown served as a visiting professor at Vassar College, New York University, Atlanta University, and Yale University. Some of his notable students include Toni Morrison, Kwame Ture ( Stokely Carmichael), Kwame Nkrumah, Thomas Sowell, Ossie Davis, and Amiri Baraka ( LeRoi Jones).

In 1969, Brown retired from his faculty position at Howard and turned full-time to poetry.

Literary career
In 1932, Brown published his first book of poetry Southern Road. It was a collection of poems, many with rural themes, and treated the simple lives of poor, black, country folk with poignancy and dignity. Brown's work included pieces of authentic dialect and structures as well as formal work.  Despite the success of this book, he struggled to find a publisher for the follow-up, No Hiding Place.

His poetic work was influenced in content, form and cadence by African-American music, including work songs, blues and jazz. Like that of Jean Toomer, Zora Neale Hurston, Langston Hughes and other black writers of the period, his work often dealt with race and class in the United States. He was deeply interested in a folk-based culture, which he considered most authentic. Brown is considered part of the Harlem Renaissance artistic tradition, although he spent the majority of his life in the Brookland neighborhood of Northeast Washington, D.C.

Honors
In 1979, the District of Columbia declared May 1, his birthday, Sterling A. Brown Day.

His Collected Poems won the Lenore Marshall Poetry Prize in the early 1980s for the best collection of poetry published that year.

In 1984, the District of Columbia named him its first poet laureate, a position he held until his death from leukemia at the age of 88.

The Friends of Libraries USA in 1997 named Founders Hall at Howard University a Literary Landmark, the first so designated in Washington, DC.

The home where Brown resided is located in the Brookland section of Northeast Washington, DC. An engraved plaque and a sign created by the DC Commission on the Arts and Humanities are featured in front of the house.

Works
Southern Road, Harcourt, Brace and Company, 1932 (original poetry)
Negro Poetry (literary criticism)
The Negro in American Fiction, Bronze booklet - no. 6 (1937), published by The Associates in Negro Folk Education (Washington, D.C.)
Negro Poetry and Drama: and the Negro in American fiction, Bronze booklet no. 7 (1937), published by The Associates in Negro Folk Education (Washington, D.C.)
The Negro Caravan, 1941, co-editor with Arthur P. Davis and Ulysses Lee (anthology of African-American literature)
The Last Ride of Wild Bill (poetry)
 (1st edition 1980)
The Poetry of Sterling Brown, recorded 1946-1973, released on Smithsonian Folkways, 1995

Old Lem (Poem)
"Old Lem" was put to music by Carla Olson with the permission of Sterling Brown’s estate. The resulting song is called "Justice" and was recorded by Olson, backed by former member of The Rolling Stones Mick Taylor and former member of the Faces Ian McLagan along Jesse Sublett on bass and Rick Hemmert on drums.

References

External links
A Literary Tribute to Sterling A. Brown
Sterling A. Brown at Modern America Poetry
Sterling A. Brown at The Academy of American Poets
Sterling Nelson Brown's autobiography, My Own Life Story

The Poetry of Sterling Brown at Smithsonian Folkways
FBI files on Sterling Brown
 Sterling A. Brown papers at Williams College Archives & Special Collections

1901 births
1989 deaths
African-American academics
African-American poets
American literary critics
Journalists from Washington, D.C.
Deaths from leukemia
Harvard Graduate School of Arts and Sciences alumni
Fisk University faculty
Howard University faculty
Williams College alumni
Writers from Washington, D.C.
Poets Laureate of the District of Columbia
Harlem Renaissance
20th-century American poets
20th-century American non-fiction writers
Dunbar High School (Washington, D.C.) alumni
20th-century African-American writers